Grittleton Strict Baptist Chapel is a Baptist chapel in The Street, Grittleton, Wiltshire, England.  It is recorded in the National Heritage List for England as a Grade II* listed building, and is owned by the Historic Chapels Trust.

History
The chapel was built in about 1720, and opened in 1721. [These dates are in some doubt after recent research.] It was promoted and supported by the Houlton family of the local manor house.  The chapel closed in 1982 but reopened in 2016, with regular services. It has been owned by the Historic Chapels Trust since 2011.

Architecture
Built in rubble stone with ashlar dressings, the chapel has a tiled roof.  Its plan is rectangular.  On the east side are four mullioned and transomed windows.  The doorway is on the south side.  Inside are north and south galleries, with a vestry under the north gallery.  In front of the vestry is an octagonal timber pulpit.  Also in the chapel are box pews, three of which are in oak dating from the 18th century, the rest in deal from the 19th century.  In addition there is a child's pew.

References

Georgian architecture in Wiltshire
Grade II* listed churches in Wiltshire
18th-century churches in the United Kingdom
Churches preserved by the Historic Chapels Trust
Baptist churches in Wiltshire
Strict Baptist chapels